The Battle of Makin was an engagement of the Pacific campaign of World War II, fought from 20 to 24 November 1943, on Makin Atoll in the Gilbert Islands.

Background

Japanese invasion and fortification
On 10 December 1941, three days after the attack on Pearl Harbor, 300 Japanese troops plus laborers of the Gilberts Invasion Special Landing Force had arrived off Makin Atoll and occupied it without resistance. Lying east of the Marshall islands, Makin was intended as an excellent seaplane base, to protect the eastern flank of the Japanese perimeter from an Allied attack by extending Japanese air patrols closer to islands held by the Allies: Howland Island, Baker Island, Tuvalu, and Phoenix and Ellice Islands.

The end of the Aleutian Islands Campaign and progress in the Solomon Islands, combined with increasing supplies of men and materials, gave the United States Navy the resources to make an invasion of the central Pacific in late 1943. Admiral Chester Nimitz had argued for this invasion earlier in 1943, but the resources were not available to carry it out at the same time as Operation Cartwheel, the envelopment of Rabaul in the Bismarck Islands. The plan was to approach the Japanese home islands by "island hopping": establishing naval and air bases in one group of islands to support the attack on the next. The Gilbert Islands were the first step in this chain.

Marine raid on Makin

On 17 August 1942, 211 Marines of the 2nd Marine Raider Battalion under command of Colonel Evans Carlson and Captain James Roosevelt were landed on Makin from two submarines, USS Nautilus and USS Argonaut. The Japanese garrison only posted 83 to 160 men under the command of a warrant officer. The Raiders killed at least 83 Japanese soldiers, annihilating the garrison, and destroyed installations for the loss of 21 killed (mostly by air attack) and 9 captured. The Japanese moved their prisoners to Kwajalein Atoll, where they were later beheaded. One objective of the raid was to confuse the Japanese about U.S. intentions in the Pacific, but it had the effect of alerting the Japanese to the strategic importance of the Gilbert Islands and led to their further reinforcement and fortification.

After Carlson's raid, the Japanese reinforced the Gilberts, which had been left lightly guarded. Makin was garrisoned with a single company of the 5th Special Base Force (700–800 men) on August 1942, and work on both the seaplane base and coastal defenses of the atoll was resumed in earnest. By July 1943 the seaplane base on Makin was completed and ready to accommodate Kawanishi H8K "Emily" flying boat bombers, Nakajima A6M2-N "Rufe" floatplane fighters and Aichi E13A "Jake" reconnaissance seaplanes. Its defenses were also completed, although they were not as extensive as on Tarawa Atoll—the main Japanese Navy air base in the Gilberts. The Chitose and 653rd Air Corps were detached and deployed here. While the Japanese were building up their defenses in the Gilberts, American forces were making plans to retake the islands.

U.S. plans to attack
In June 1943, the Joint Chiefs of Staff directed Admiral Chester W. Nimitz, Commander in Chief of the Pacific Fleet (CINCPAC), to submit a plan to occupy the Marshall Islands. Initially both Nimitz and Admiral Ernest J. King, the Chief of Naval Operations, wanted to attack right into the heart of the Japanese outer defense perimeter, but any plan for assaulting the Marshalls directly from Pearl Harbor would have required more troops and transports than the Pacific Fleet had at the time. Considering these drawbacks and the limited combat experience of the U.S. forces, King and Nimitz decided to take the Marshalls in a step-by-step operation via the Ellice and Gilbert Islands. The Gilberts lay within  of the Southern Marshalls and were well within range of United States Army Air Forces B-24 aircraft based in the Ellice Islands, which could provide bombing support and long-range reconnaissance for operations in the Gilberts. With those advantages in mind, on 20 July 1943 the joint Chiefs of Staff decided to capture the Tarawa and Abemama atolls in the Gilberts, plus nearby Nauru Island. The operation was codenamed "Operation Galvanic."

On 4 September, the U.S. 5th Fleet's amphibious troops were designated the V Amphibious Corps and placed under Marine Corps Major General Holland M. Smith. The V Amphibious Corps had the only two divisions, the 2nd Marine Division based in New Zealand, and the U.S. Army's 27th Infantry Division based in Hawaii. The 27th Infantry Division had been a New York National Guard unit before being called into federal service in October 1940. It was transferred to Hawaii and remained there for 1½ years before being chosen by Lt. Gen. Robert C. Richardson Jr., U.S. Army Commanding General in the Central Pacific, for the Gilbert Islands invasion. Captain James Jones (father of James L. Jones, Commandant of the Marine Corps 1999–2003), Commanding Officer of Amphibious Reconnaissance Company, VAC performed a periscope reconnaissance of the Gilberts aboard the submarine USS Nautilus, establishing accurate accounts of the beachheads for the upcoming invasion.

The 27th Infantry Division was tasked to supply the landing force, with one regimental combat team (the 165th Infantry Regiment, the famed "Fighting 69th" of the New York National Guard), reinforced by a battalion landing team (the 3rd Battalion, 105th Infantry Regiment), supported by the 105th Field Artillery Battalion and the 193rd Tank Battalion, under Major General Ralph C. Smith, a veteran of World War I, who had assumed command in November 1942. He was one of the most highly respected officers in the U. S. Army of the time. In April 1943, the 27th Infantry Division had begun preparing for amphibious operations.

Planning for the 27th Infantry Division's role in "Galvanic" (the Army portion was codenamed "Kourbash") began in early August 1943, with Nauru Island in the western Gilberts as the original objective. Unlike the other objectives, Nauru was an actual island, much larger in size and more heavily garrisoned.

However, in September 1943 the 27th's objective changed. The difficulty of providing adequate naval and air support of simultaneous operations at Tarawa and the much more distant Nauru, plus lack of sufficient transport to carry the entire division required to take the larger, more heavily defended Nauru, caused Admiral Nimitz to shift the 27th's objective from Nauru to Makin Atoll, in the northeast Gilberts. The 27th Infantry Division staff learned the change of target on 28 September, scrapped the original Nauru plan, and began planning to capture Makin.

Heavy aircraft losses and the disabling of four heavy cruisers in the Solomon Islands (Bombing of Rabaul) meant that the original Japanese plan of a strike at the American invasion fleet by forces based at Truk in the nearby Caroline Islands (South Seas Mandate) was scrapped. The garrisons at Tarawa and Makin were left to their fate.

Prelude

The invasion fleet, Task Force 52 (TF 52) commanded by Rear Admiral Richmond K. Turner left Pearl Harbor on 10 November 1943. The landing force, Task Group 52.6, consisted of units of the 27th Infantry Division commanded by Major General Ralph C. Smith, transported by attack transports Neville, Leonard Wood, Calvert, and Pierce; attack cargo ship Alcyone; landing ship dock Belle Grove; and LSTs −31, −78, and −179 of Task Group 52.1.

On the eve of invasion, the Japanese garrison on Makin Atoll's main island, Butaritari, numbered 806 men: 284 naval ground troops of the 6th Special Naval Landing Force, 108 aviation personnel of the 802nd and 952nd Aviation Units, 138 troops of the 111th Pioneers, and 276 men of the Fourth Fleet Construction Department and Makin Tank Detachment of 3rd Special Base Force (3 Type 95 Ha-Go Light Tanks), all commanded by Lt.j.g. Seizo Ishikawa. The number of trained combat troops on Makin was not more than 300 soldiers.

Butaritari's land defenses were centered around the lagoon shore, near the seaplane base in the central part of the island. It was protected by a double apron of barbed wire and an intricate system of gun emplacements and rifle pits.

A series of strongpoints was established along Butaritari's ocean side, with  coastal defense guns, three 37 mm anti-tank gun positions, 10 machine gun emplacements and 85 rifle pits. The Japanese expected the invasion to come on the ocean side of Butaritari, following the example of Carlson's raid in 1942, and established their defenses  from where the raid had taken place. Without aircraft, ships, or hope of reinforcement or relief, the outnumbered and outgunned defenders could only hope to delay the coming American attack for as long as possible.

Battle

Invasion
Air operations against Makin began on 13 November 1943, with USAAF Consolidated B-24 Liberator bombers of the Seventh Air Force from the Ellice Islands. Grumman FM-1 Wildcat fighters escorted Douglas SBD Dauntless dive bombers and Grumman TBF Avengers from escort carriers USS Liscome Bay, USS Coral Sea and USS Corregidor; followed by  support guns from fire support ship USS Minneapolis and other war vessels. During the bombardment, a turret explosion on battleship  killed 43 sailors.

Troops began to go ashore at two beaches at 08:30 on 20 November. The initial landings on Red Beach went according to plan with the assault troops moving rapidly inland after an uneventful trip on the ocean side of the island. Their progress off the beach was slowed only by an occasional sniper and the need to negotiate their way around the debris and water-filled craters left by the air and naval bombardment. The craters in particular stymied tank support of the Red Beach forces by the light tanks of the 193rd Tank Battalion when the lead M3 light tank became partially submerged in a shellhole and blocked passage of all the vehicles behind it.

As the landing craft approached Yellow Beach from the lagoon, they began to receive small-arms and machine-gun fire from the island's defenders. The assault troops were also surprised to discover that even though they were approaching the beach at high tide as planned, a miscalculation of the lagoon's depth caused their small boats to go aground, forcing them to walk the final  to the beach in waist-deep water. Equipment and weapons were lost or water-soaked, but only three men were killed approaching the beach, mainly because the defenders chose to make their final stand farther inland along the tank barriers.

The U.S. invasion plan was conceived in the hope of luring the Japanese into committing most of its forces to oppose the first landings on Red Beach and thereby allow the troops landing on Yellow Beach to attack from the rear. The Japanese, however, did not respond to the attack on Red Beach, and withdrew from Yellow Beach with only harassing fire, leaving the troops of the 27th Division no choice but to knock out the fortified strongpoints one by one. Reduction operations were hampered by the frequent inability to use heavy support weapons, including tanks, because of the danger of cross-fire. The commander of the 165th Infantry Regiment, Col. Gardiner Conroy, was killed in action by a Japanese sniper on the afternoon of the first day and was succeeded by Col. Gerard W. Kelley.

Capture of Makin
Two days of determined fighting reduced Japanese resistance. After clearing the entire atoll, the 27th Division commander, Maj. Gen. Ralph C. Smith, reported on the morning of 23 November 1943, "Makin taken, recommend command pass to commander garrison force."

The most difficult problem capturing Makin was coordinating the actions of two separate landing forces, made more difficult because the defenders did not respond as anticipated. The unsuitability of the narrow beaches for supply landing operations—which went undiscovered by pre-invasion reconnaissance—was also a severe handicap.

Sinking of USS Liscome Bay
In the early hours of 24 November 1943, the escort carrier and flagship USS Liscome Bay was sunk by the Japanese submarine I-175, which had arrived near Makin just a few hours before. A single torpedo, launched as part of a torpedo spread by I-175, detonated the Liscome Bay'''s aircraft bomb stockpile, causing an explosion which engulfed the entire ship, causing it to sink quickly. The attack on the Liscome Bay accounted for the majority of American casualties in the Battle of Makin. Of the 916 crewmen of Liscome Bay only 272 were rescued, while 644 perished (53 officers and 591 enlisted men), including the flagship's admiral and task force group commander, Rear Admiral Henry M. Mullinnix, carrier captain, Captain Irving Wiltsie, and Pearl Harbor Navy Cross recipient Cook Third Class Dorie Miller.

The loss of the Liscome Bay on the eve of Thanksgiving that year was due to a few factors. Two destroyers of the destroyer screen, USS Hull and USS Franks, left the destroyer screen, leaving a gap in the screen. Also, the task force which included the Liscome Bay was not zigzagging. The Japanese submarine I-175 approached the task force undetected and fired a spread of torpedoes through the gap in the anti-submarine screen, one of which struck and sank the Liscome Bay.

Aftermath
The complete occupation of Makin took four days and cost considerably more in naval casualties than in ground forces. Despite possessing great superiority in men and weapons, the 27th Division had difficulty subduing the island's small defense force. One Japanese Ha-Go tank was destroyed in combat, and two tanks placed in revetments were abandoned without being used in combat.

Against an estimated 395 Japanese killed in action during the operation, American ground casualties numbered 66 killed and 152 wounded. U.S. Navy losses were significantly higher: 644 deaths on the Liscome Bay'', 43 killed in a turret fire on the battleship , and 10 killed in action with naval shore parties or as aviators, for a total of 697 naval deaths. The overall total of 763 American dead almost equalled the number of men in the entire Japanese garrison.

See also
 69th New York Infantry Regiment
 Marine Raiders
 Makin (atoll)
 Gilbert and Marshall Islands campaign
 Battle of Tarawa

Notes

References

External links

Conflicts in 1943
1943 in the Gilbert and Ellice Islands
History of Kiribati
Kiribati in World War II
Wars involving Kiribati
Makin
United States Marine Corps in World War II
Makin
Japan–Kiribati relations
Amphibious operations involving the United States